Björn Thorsell (born 20 March 1964) is a retired Swedish ice hockey defender. Thorsell was part of the Djurgården Swedish champions' team of 1983.

Thorsell made 247 Division 1 appearances for Nacka HK, IK Vita Hästen, and Danderyd/Täby, and has also represented the Division 2 side Stocksunds IF.

References

1964 births
Djurgårdens IF Hockey players
Living people
Nacka HK players
Swedish ice hockey players